Bunch may refer to:

 Bunch (surname)
 Bunch Davis, American baseball player in the Negro leagues
 BUNCH, nickname of five computer manufacturing companies, IBM's main competitors in the 1970s
 Tussock (grass) or bunch grass, members of the family Poaceae
 Bunch, Oklahoma, United States
 Bunch Creek, Placer County, California, United States
 The Bunch, a 1972 folk rock group
 , a United States Navy destroyer escort
 Humpback whale, sometimes called a bunch

See also 

 Bunch Reservoir, Apache County, Arizona, United States
 Wild Bunch (disambiguation)
 Brunch
 Bunches
 Bunching (disambiguation)